The 1979 season of the Tongan A Grade was the 7th season of top flight association football competition in Tonga. No champion has been recorded for this season.

References 

Tonga Major League seasons
Tonga
Football